Bennys Run (also known as Buddys Run or Benny's Run) is a tributary of Shamokin Creek in Northumberland County, Pennsylvania, in the United States. The stream is not designated as an impaired waterbody and it has a relatively high level of water quality. It is a small, shallow stream and its watershed is designated as a Coldwater Fishery and a Migratory Fishery. A few bridges have been constructed across the stream.

Course

Bennys Run begins in a pond in Shamokin Township. It flows northeast for a few tenths of a mile before turning east-northeast and flowing through a valley. Over the next few miles, the stream receives four unnamed tributaries from the left and one unnamed tributary from the right. It then turns north-northeast for a few tenths of a mile before crossing Pennsylvania Route 61 and reaching its confluence with Shamokin Creek.

Hydrology
Bennys Run is not designated as an impaired waterbody. The engineering department of the Pennsylvania Department of Transportation once received an NPDES permit to discharge stormwater into the stream for construction purposes. However, in 2005 and 2006, the Pennsylvania Department of Environmental Protection received complaints about untreated sewage discharge into the creek.

Bennys Run has a relatively high level of water quality. It is not impacted by mining.

Geography and geology

Bennys Run is a small and shallow stream situated in Irish Valley. It flows in a generally easterly direction.

Watershed
The mouth of the stream is in the United States Geological Survey quadrangle of Shamokin. However, its source is in the quadrangle of Trevorton. The watershed borders several other watersheds, including the Little Shamokin Creek watershed, the Lick Run watershed, and the lower Shamokin Creek watershed.

A road known as Irish Valley Road runs alongside Bennys Run for some distance. There are areas of rural land in the vicinity of the stream.

History
Bennys Run was entered into the Geographic Names Information System on August 2, 1979. Its identifier in the Geographic Names Information System is 1169259. The stream is named after "Benny", a man who used to live along the stream. However, it is also known as Buddys Run or Benny's Run. This variant name appears on a United States Geological Survey map from 1952. However, in 1969, several locals who had lived near the stream for 50 years had never heard of the stream being called Buddys Run.

A concrete tee beam bridge carrying Pennsylvania Route 61 over Bennys Run was built in 1947. A concrete culvert bridge carrying State Route 4026 was built across the stream in 1996.

Biology
The drainage basin of Bennys run is designated as a Coldwater Fishery and a Migratory Fishery.

See also
Millers Run, next tributary of Shamokin Creek going downstream
Trout Run (Shamokin Creek), next tributary of Shamokin Creek going upstream
List of rivers of Pennsylvania
List of tributaries of Shamokin Creek

References

Rivers of Northumberland County, Pennsylvania
Tributaries of Shamokin Creek
Rivers of Pennsylvania